Several ships of the Argentine Navy have been named ARA Santa Cruz (or Santa Cruz before the 1860s):

 , a schooner 
 , a schooner purchased in 1876 and lost in 1880
 , a steam transport purchased in 1896 and decommissioned in 1905
 , a tanker launched in 1921, transferred to YPF, and scrapped in 1948
 , a  launched in 1938 and scrapped in 1973
 , a  launched in 1982, currently in service with the Argentine Navy

Argentine Navy ship names